Microbacterium ulmi is a Gram-positive, aerobic, xylanolytic, rod-shaped and non-motile bacterium from the genus Microbacterium which has been isolated from sawdust from the tree Ulmus nigra in Salamanca in Spain.

References

Further reading 
 

Bacteria described in 2004
ulmi